Bremnes is a former municipality in the old Hordaland county, Norway.  The municipality existed from 1916 until 1963, when it was merged into the new municipality of Bømlo which is now part of Vestland county.  The administrative centre of the municipality was the village of Svortland, where Bremnes Church is located.  The  municipality covered the northern and western half of the island of Bømlo as well as the many small, surrounding islets.

History
The municipality of Bremnes was established on 1 July 1916 when the old municipality of Finnås was split into the three new municipalities: Moster (population: 1,316), Bømlo (population: 1,217), and Bremnes (population: 3,411). During the 1960s, there were many municipal mergers across Norway due to the work of the Schei Committee. On 1 January 1963, the three municipalities of Moster (population: 1,834), Bømlo (population: 1,463), and Bremnes (population: 4,829) were merged into a new, larger Bømlo Municipality.

Government

Municipal council
The municipal council  of Bremnes was made up of 23 representatives that were elected to four year terms.  The party breakdown of the final municipal council was as follows:

See also
List of former municipalities of Norway

References

External links
Bremnes Bygdebøker (local history book) Held at the University of Minnesota Libraries (wilson.lib.umn.edu)

Bømlo
Former municipalities of Norway
1916 establishments in Norway
1963 disestablishments in Norway